MotoGP 20 is a video game developed by Milestone srl.

Features 
MotoGP 20 has these game modes: Historical, Multiplayer, Career, Fast Modes, Personalization and historical Content.

The new AI, dubbed "Neural AI 2.0" is more efficient in riding, and is able to manage tyre wear and fuel consumption unlike MotoGP 19's AI. The Managerial Career returns to the series with improvements. The player has a team of professionals including the Personal Manager, the Chief Engineer and the Data Analyst, their role will be vital for finding engagements, obtaining data on the track and developing the motorbike.

MotoGP 20 features the season as it was originally intended to be run before the season was disrupted by the COVID-19 pandemic, which saw several races postponed or cancelled, with a race at the Algarve International Circuit held. However, it has the Thai Grand Prix after the Aragon round, when the Thai race was originally intended to be run on March 22.

It also includes the cancelled Finnish Grand Prix for the first time.

Reception 
The game was well-received by the media, with scores hitting 76%.

References 

Grand Prix motorcycle racing
Milestone srl games
Grand Prix motorcycle racing video games
Multiplayer and single-player video games
PlayStation 4 games
Racing video games
Video games developed in Italy
Windows games
Xbox One games
Nintendo Switch games
2020 video games
PlayStation 4 Pro enhanced games
Unreal Engine games
Stadia games
Video games set in Argentina
Video games set in Australia
Video games set in Austria
Video games set in the Czech Republic
Video games set in England
Video games set in France
Video games set in Germany
Video games set in Italy
Video games set in Japan
Video games set in Malaysia
Video games set in the Netherlands
Video games set in Qatar
Video games set in Spain
Video games set in Texas
Video games set in Thailand
Xbox Cloud Gaming games